The 2019 Louisiana–Monroe Warhawks football team represented University of Louisiana at Monroe in the 2019 NCAA Division I FBS football season. The Warhawks played their home games at Malone Stadium in Monroe, Louisiana, and competed in the West Division of the Sun Belt Conference. They were led by fourth-year head coach Matt Viator.

Preseason

Sun Belt media poll
The Sun Belt coaches poll was released on July 18, 2019. Louisiana–Monroe was picked to finish 3rd in the West Division with 27 total votes.

Preseason All-Sun Belt teams
Offense

2nd team

Caleb Evans - SR, Quarterback
T. J. Fiailoa – R-SR, Offensive Line

Personnel

Schedule
Louisiana–Monroe announced its 2019 football schedule on March 1, 2019. The 2019 schedule consists of 6 home and away games in the regular season.

Schedule Source:

Game summaries

Grambling State

at Florida State

at Iowa State

South Alabama

Memphis

at Texas State

at Appalachian State

Arkansas State

Georgia State

at Georgia Southern

Coastal Carolina

at Louisiana

References

Louisiana-Monroe
Louisiana–Monroe Warhawks football seasons
Louisiana-Monroe Warhawks football